Copperas Branch is a stream in Hickman County, Tennessee, in the United States.

History
Copperas Branch was named for the nearby mining of copperas by early settlers.

See also
List of rivers of Tennessee

References

Rivers of Hickman County, Tennessee
Rivers of Tennessee